The Edison Bridge is the name given to a set of two one-way bridges located in Fort Myers, Florida. Named after inventor Thomas Alva Edison, the two bridges carry each direction of U.S. Highway 41 Business (US 41 Bus.) over the Caloosahatchee River, connecting downtown Fort Myers (on the southern shore) with North Fort Myers.

They land at the same point on the north side of the river but are separated by a few blocks on the south side since US 41 Bus. runs on two separate one-way streets in Downtown Fort Myers. When looking on a map, the two spans and the south bank of the river form a right triangle. The two bridges were built in the early 1990s, replacing a single two-lane drawbridge which also bore the name Edison Bridge. The original bridge, which was located on the site of the southbound span, was once part of the Tamiami Trail.

History

The original Edison Bridge opened for traffic on February 11, 1931, the 84th birthday of its namesake Thomas Edison. Edison, who had a winter home in Fort Myers, dedicated the bridge, and was also the first to drive across it.

The original Edison Bridge was built to carry the Tamiami Trail, which had previously crossed the river on a narrow wooden bridge upstream that opened on March 12, 1924. This bridge was located in East Fort Myers at Freemont Street and connected to what is today known as Old Bridge Road in North Fort Myers. Construction of the bridge at Freemont Street was initially started by a private company with the intention of making it a toll bridge. Lee County planned to initially use the bridge at Freemont Street for its portion of the planned Tamiami Trail, but the federal government would not designate it as part of a U.S. Highway if the bridge had a toll. So, the county purchased the bridge and completed its construction.

The bridge at Freemont Street was only intended to be a temporary crossing of the Caloosahatchee River for the Tamiami Trail. It was too far east of downtown Fort Myers and was too narrow, making passing difficult. A couple of locations were determined as potential sites for a permanent bridge, including Carson Street west of downtown (which would later become the location of the Caloosahatchee Bridge). But it was ultimately decided that a new bridge, which would become the Edison Bridge, would connect Fowler Street (east of downtown) with a rerouted portion of the Tamiami Trail (US 41) on the north side. After the Edison Bridge opened, the bridge at Freemont Street remained in service as a secondary bridge until 1940, when the wooden structure was destroyed by a fire.

The original Edison Bridge carried US 41 from its opening in 1931 up until 1964, when the Caloosahatchee Bridge, a new four-lane high-level fixed bridge, opened just downstream on the other side of downtown. US 41 was rerouted onto the new structure, bypassing downtown Fort Myers. The route over the Edison Bridge was redesignated as US 41 Bus., but is still considered part of the Tamiami Trail.

The original Edison Bridge was replaced with the current dual high-level bridge spans in the early 1990s. The northbound span opened in 1992, and the southbound span opened in 1993. The alignment of the two spans is similar to that of the Barron Collier Bridge and the Gilchrist Bridge, which carry US 41 over the Peace River just to the north in Punta Gorda.

Gallery

See also
 
 
 
 List of crossings of the Caloosahatchee River

References

External links

Road bridges in Florida
Bridges over the Caloosahatchee River
Transportation in Fort Myers, Florida
Buildings and structures in Fort Myers, Florida
U.S. Route 41
Bridges of the United States Numbered Highway System
Bridges completed in 1993
Bridges completed in 1931
1931 establishments in Florida
1993 establishments in Florida
Concrete bridges in the United States
Bridges in Lee County, Florida